Kumarghat is a town and subdivision in Unakoti district in Tripura, India. It is a municipal council and the 14th largest town in Tripura by population. Kumarghat railway station is the only railway station in Unakoti district.

Demographics
As of 2011, Kumarghat sub-division had a population of 157,972.

Education

Colleges/Universities 

 College of Teachers' Education

College of Teacher Education (CTE), Kumarghat is located at Sukantanagar, Kumarghat, about 150 km away from Agartala, the state capital. It is 1.1 km away from NH44 near Kumarghat Police Station and about 500 meters away from Kumarghat Railway Station.

Transportation 

Kumarghat railway station is one of the few railway stations in Tripura, which is connected with Agartala and Silchar.

See also
 List of cities and towns in Tripura

References

Cities and towns in Unakoti district